Snowzilla may refer to:

Snowmageddon, Snowpocalypse, and Snowzilla, common nicknames for various winter storms in North America and the United Kingdom, including:
January 2016 United States blizzard
February 9–10, 2010 North American blizzard
Snowzilla (snowman), a giant snowman built annually in Anchorage, Alaska
Snowzilla, a jet-powered snow blower used on the Massachusetts Bay Transportation Authority's Ashmont–Mattapan High Speed Line